Mazaniec  is a village in the administrative district of Gmina Siemkowice, within Pajęczno County, Łódź Voivodeship, in central Poland.

The village has a population of 80.

References

Mazaniec